Orimodema is a genus of broad-nosed weevils in the beetle family Curculionidae. There is one described species in Orimodema, O. protracta.

References

Further reading

 
 
 
 

Entiminae
Articles created by Qbugbot